San Cucufate de Llanera is a parish of the municipality of Llanera, Asturias.  Its name refers to Saint Cucuphas.

Sources
 Rodríguez Álvarez, Ramón (May 2008). Real Instituto de Estudios Asturianos, ed. Llanera. Asturias concejo a concejo 13. Oviedo 
 Memoria Cultural y Natural del Concejo de Llanera, pdf. 2008

Parishes in Llanera